Jonas Rathsman is a Swedish producer of electronic music and graphic designer.

He was born in a small village in Western Sweden. At the age of 18, he started organizing parties at local nightclubs in Gothenburg. 
Using this platform Jonas Rathsman began producing music under his own name and quickly caught the attention of the French Express label. It was with French Express that he began to release his music, starting in 2011 with the bass heavy 'Love Is My Middle Name'  which was featured on the second instalment of the French Express compilation. Jonas quickly followed up this success with his first solo release on French Express 'Tobago/Feeling You' gaining high-profile support from the likes of The Magician.

Jonas' reputation continued to grow following two more releases on French Express, 'Since I Don't Have You' and 'W4W' that got notable BBC Radio 1 support from Pete Tong, who was such a fan of Jonas' output that he invited him to play the coveted Essential Mix with fellow French Express artist, Perseus.

He continued to supply the world of underground house music with releases on French Express and his productions eventually lead to Pete Tong tipping Jonas Rathsman as his 'Future Star' for 2014. 
As a result of this he was asked to remix Sam Smith's single, Like I Can later that year.

Since then, the level of support for Jonas has grown exponentially. Disclosure are now the most notable backers and have invited him to produce the inaugural release on their new extension of Method Records, 'Method White'. 'Wolfsbane' was released on 23 March 2015 has already made huge waves across the underground music scene. Following the buzz of 'Wolfsbane', Jonas was invited for the second time by Pete Tong to feature on a new Essential Mix in July 2015.

It has been a lifelong ambition to build a studio space that would extend his eye for creative detail and follow his passion for bringing like-minded people together. Over 2017, Rathsman designed and created a six-room studio complex, situated in an industrial area of Gothenburg where the North Sea flows into the city. The studio provides Rathsman with a space to seek musical solace and to create, as well as providing a home for his beloved equipment. Internally, it is decorated with reclaimed wood found on walks with his two young sons. Everything has been treated, cut and fitted by himself, echoing Jonas' commitment to sustainability.

Having released on a range of imprints from Diynamic and KX to Crosstown Rebels and Mobilee, Rathsman is now focusing his efforts on building his ELEMENTS brand, a journey which began in 2017 off the back of his debut BBC Radio 1 Essential Mix. The name ELEMENTS touches on things that influence Rathsman musically; natural, organic and worldly sounds. It also reflects his desire to put on intimate parties in unique and remote locations, continuing the connections with his audience.

In 2018 ELEMENTS has grown into a multifaceted brand and is split into three parts: the label, the mix series and the parties. The label was successfully introduced with Rathsman's own 'Within Borders' and is about to celebrate its seventh release from French techno hero Sébastien Léger. Its events arm launched with a sold-out show at London's Autumn Street Studios and has taken residency in XOYO for 2018 having hosted Pional and Fort Romeu for their opening with Kiasmos soon to follow.

Discography

Tracks

Remixes

References

Swedish record producers
Living people
Year of birth missing (living people)